Manchester Central may refer to:

United Kingdom
 Manchester Central Convention Complex, an exhibition and conference centre converted from the former station:
 Manchester Central railway station, a former railway station in Manchester city centre, England
 Manchester Central Library, the main public library in Manchester
 Manchester Central Mosque, a mosque in Rusholme, Manchester
 Manchester Central (UK Parliament constituency)

Other places
 Manchester Central High School, a public high school in Manchester, New Hampshire, US

Jamaica 

 Manchester Central (Jamaica Parliament constituency)

Other uses
 Manchester Central (Salvation Army), the principal Salvation Army church in Manchester 
 Manchester Central F.C., a short lived football team

See also
 Manchester city centre